Hospital de Bellvitge, formerly known as Feixa Llarga, is a Barcelona Metro station, in the L'Hospitalet de Llobregat municipality of the Barcelona metropolitan area, and named after the nearby Bellvitge University Hospital. The station is the western terminus of line L1.

The station lies under the car park of the hospital, between the hospital itself and the Gran Via de les Corts Catalanes. Beyond the platforms at the country end of the station are several storage and reversing sidings.

The station opened in 1989, when line L1 was extended from Avinguda Carrilet station. It was originally known as Feixa Llarga, after the Estadi La Feixa Llarga, the football stadium of local team CE L'Hospitalet. It was given its current name in 2003.

Future plans are for L1 to be extended from this station towards El Prat de Llobregat, where it will provide interchange with the planned joint section of lines L2 and L9 towards Barcelona Airport.

See also
List of Barcelona Metro stations
Transport in L'Hospitalet de Llobregat

References

External links
 
 Trenscat.com

Barcelona Metro line 1 stations
Railway stations in Spain opened in 1989
1989 establishments in Catalonia
Railway stations in L'Hospitalet de Llobregat
Railway stations located underground in Spain